Craig Richard Worthington (born April 17, 1965) is a former professional baseball player. He played all or part of seven seasons in Major League Baseball, between 1988 and 1996, for the Baltimore Orioles, Cleveland Indians, Cincinnati Reds, and Texas Rangers, primarily as a third baseman. He played the end of the 1996 season in Japan for the Hanshin Tigers.

Career
Worthington was drafted by the Orioles in the 1st round (11th pick) of the 1985 amateur draft's secondary phase. The third baseman showed much promise, posting 15 home runs and 70 RBIs in 1989 with Baltimore. Craig was named to the Topps rookie all-star team.

He attended Cantwell High School in Montebello, California.

External links

1965 births
Living people
African-American baseball players
American expatriate baseball players in Japan
American expatriate baseball players in Mexico
American expatriate baseball players in Taiwan
Baltimore Orioles players
Baseball players from Los Angeles
Bluefield Orioles players
Cerritos Falcons baseball players
Cincinnati Reds players
Cleveland Indians players
Colorado Springs Sky Sox players
Hagerstown Suns players
Hanshin Tigers players
Indianapolis Indians players
International League MVP award winners
Iowa Cubs players
Koos Group Whales players
Major League Baseball third basemen
Newark Bears players
Nippon Professional Baseball third basemen
Oklahoma City 89ers players
Sultanes de Monterrey players
Rochester Red Wings players
Texas Rangers players
21st-century African-American people
20th-century African-American sportspeople
Alaska Goldpanners of Fairbanks players